The Jim Crockett Sr. Memorial Cup Tag Team Tournament (also known simply as the Crockett Cup) is a professional wrestling event produced every April by the professional wrestling promotion, National Wrestling Alliance (NWA). The event features a tag team professional wrestling tournament with the Crockett Cup awarded to the winning tag team.

Event history
The Jim Crockett Sr. Memorial Cup Tag Team Tournament was created by Jim Crockett Jr. of Jim Crockett Promotions (JCP) in honor of Crockett's father, JCP founder Jim Crockett Sr. The tournament format was single-elimination with a promoted prize of $1 million (U.S.) awarded to the winning team. JCP held the event every April in 1986, 1987, and 1988 before selling the company to Ted Turner (via TBS) in November 1988.

In July 2017, the Crockett Foundation, with Classic Pro Wrestling, held a spin-off version called the Crockett Foundation Cup Tag Team Tournament in New Kent, Virginia. Bobby Fulton, The Barbarian, and The Rock 'n' Roll Express were previous tournament wrestlers that took part in the event. The Geordie Bulldogs (Mark Denny and Sean Denny) were the tournament champions.

On October 1, 2017, William Patrick Corgan's purchase of the NWA (via his company Lightning One, Inc.) was finalized. In addition to ending its operation as a governing body, the NWA vacated all titles, except for the NWA Worlds Heavyweight Championship and the NWA World Women's Championship, and all licenses with previously-affiliated promotions expired. From that point on, NWA gradually became a singular wrestling promotion.

In October 2018, during the NWA 70th Anniversary Show, it was announced that the Jim Crockett Sr. Memorial Cup Tag Team Tournament, now simply called the Crockett Cup, would be returning in April 2019. Thirty-one years after the previous event, the fourth annual Crockett Cup was held on April 27, 2019.

In June 2019, the inaugural event from 1986 was uploaded to the WWE Network.

In January 2020, during NWA's Hard Times pay-per-view, it was announced the Crockett Cup would be returning again in April 2020, thus confirming the Crockett Cup as an annual event held by the NWA. On February 18 the NWA announced the date of April 19 for when the Cup would be held and they announced the venue would be the Gateway Center Arena in College Park, Georgia. However, the 2020 event was canceled due to the global pandemic. It would return in 2022 as a two-night event on March 19 and 20.

Tournament winners
 1986: The Road Warriors (Animal and Hawk)
 1987: The Super Powers (Nikita Koloff and Dusty Rhodes)
 1988: Sting and Lex Luger
 2019: Villain Enterprises (Brody King and PCO)
 2022: The Briscoe Brothers (Jay Briscoe and Mark Briscoe)
 2023: TBD

Dates and venues

References

External links

 
Jim Crockett Promotions shows
National Wrestling Alliance shows
Recurring events established in 1986